Walking on Sunshine is the debut studio album by English new wave band Katrina and the Waves, released on December 1, 1983, by Attic Records. The album was only officially released in Canada, but now appears worldwide on the 2003 compilation The Original Recordings 1983-1984.  The band initially released the album themselves, before it was even titled, intending to sell it at gigs. Several of these original 1983 vinyl releases are evidently still in circulation, primarily in the band's native UK, with the record being simply titled Katrina and the Waves (recognizable by the black and white cover, and not to be confused with the band's self-titled 1985 album, which contains revamped tracks from this and the following album, Katrina and the Waves 2).  The same cover for this UK release was used when the album was remastered and re-released with four bonus tracks on CD in 2010, under the title Katrina and the Waves. To complicate things further, a later greatest hits album by the band is also called Walking on Sunshine. "Que Te Quiero" was released as a single in the UK where it reached #84 on the UK Singles Chart in January 1984.

This album contains the original version of the title track, which would be re-recorded two years later and thereupon become the band's biggest US hit.

It appeared in many films and TV shows since, including the animated sci-fi/sitcom series Futurama, albeit as a running gag where Philip J. Fry sings or mentions the song.

Background
Walking on Sunshine was recorded in London at Alaska Studios with engineer and producer Pat Collier, former bassist with the Vibrators. "I had a small studio in a rehearsal room ... I was recording indie records, and that's how I met Kimberley when he was in the Soft Boys," Collier said. Located in a railway arch under Waterloo Station, the studio was noisy and damp, and "very horrible," according to Collier. "They would always record as an entire band," he said. "They might patch and repair stuff after. They would always do the vocal again. But the basic thing was live."

The album, which was originally intended to be sold at gigs and to shop around for a record deal, cost $1,200 to make, which the band put up themselves. Labels in the UK and the US were approached, but only Canadian indie label Attic Records, which had previously released recordings by guitarist Kimberley Rew's former band the Soft Boys, responded with an offer. Consequently, Walking On Sunshine was released only in Canada, despite the band being based in the UK. Critical praise and radio airplay, for the title track in particular, resulted in a Canadian tour.

"Going Down to Liverpool", "Machine Gun Smith", "Walking on Sunshine" and "Que Te Quiero" would be re-recorded for the band's 1985 major label debut Katrina and the Waves, while "I Really Taught Me to Watusi" would be reworked for their 1991 album Pet the Tiger.

Critical reception

AllMusic's Mark Deming called it "a good pop album," and wrote: "Kimberley Rew's guitar work is as stellar as ever, and his songwriting is clever and taut on each of these ten tunes." The Rolling Stone Album Guide called it "a masterpiece of guitar pop," and Trouser Press said that it "flows magnificently from start to end, and subsumes individual accomplishments into a true group effort. A greatest hits album the first time out."

Reissue
Walking on Sunshine was reissued in 2010 on the CGB label in a limited edition of 1000 copies, each individually numbered. It includes previously unreleased material and all tracks have been remastered from the original master tapes. The booklet includes detailed recording credits, band interviews, rare photos, and liner notes by former Attic Records employee Ralph Alfonso, who got the band signed to the label in 1983. The cover art to the album is the self-released version that the band sold at gigs in the UK before signing with Attic.

Track listing
All songs written by Kimberley Rew, except where noted.

Notes
An earlier recording of "Brown Eyed Son" was released as a one-off single for Albion Records in 1982, when the band was still called the Waves. Together with an earlier recording of "Going Down to Liverpool", it was included on the Waves' mini-album Shock Horror!.  
"Wipe Out" and "She Loves to Groove" were recorded in 1982 at Silo Studios in London.

Personnel
Katrina and the Waves
Katrina Leskanich - lead vocals, rhythm guitar
Kimberley Rew - lead guitar, vocals, lead vocals on "Going Down to Liverpool", "Don't Take Her Out of My World" and "She Loves to Groove"
Vince de la Cruz - bass, vocals
Alex Cooper - drums, vocals

Additional musicians
Nick Glennie-Smith - organ
Kevin Flanagan - saxophone, trumpets and octave trumpets

Technical
Pat Collier - producer, engineer, mixing
John de la Cruz - photography
Richard Bishop - producer on "Wipe Out" and "She Loves to Groove"
Nick Cook - producer on "Wipe Out" and "She Loves to Groove"

References

1983 debut albums
Katrina and the Waves albums
Attic Records albums